Hesperocyparis macrocarpa is a coniferous tree. It is commonly known as the Monterey cypress and is one of several species of cypress trees endemic to California.

The Monterey cypress is found naturally only on the Central Coast of California. The natural distributional range of the species during modern times is confined to two small relict populations near Carmel, California, at Cypress Point in Pebble Beach and at Point Lobos.  Historically during the peak of the last ice age, Monterey cypress would have likely comprised a much larger forest that extended much further north and south.

Description 
Hesperocyparis macrocarpa is a medium-sized coniferous evergreen tree, which often becomes irregular and flat-topped as a result of the strong winds that are typical of its native area. It grows to heights of up to 40 meters (133 feet) in perfect growing conditions, and its trunk diameter can reach 2.5 meters (over 8 feet). The foliage grows in dense sprays which are bright green in color and release a deep lemony aroma when crushed. The leaves are scale-like, 2–5 mm long, and produced on rounded (not flattened) shoots; seedlings up to a year old have needle-like leaves 4–8 mm long.

The seed cones are globose to oblong, 20–40 mm long, with 6–14 scales, green at first, maturing brown about 20–24 months after pollination. The pollen cones are 3–5 mm long, and release their pollen in late winter or early spring. The Latin specific epithet macrocarpa means "with large fruit".

Because of the large trunk size some trees develop, people have assumed that individual H. macrocarpa trees may be up to 2,000 years old.  However, the longest-lived report based on physical evidence is only 284 years old. The renowned Californian botanist Willis Linn Jepson wrote that "the advertisement of [C. macrocarpa trees] in seaside literature as 1,000 to 2,000 years old does not ... rest upon any actual data, and probably represents a desire to minister to a popular craving for superlatives".  Few trees survive beyond 100 years. As a counterpoint to this, many of the earliest introductions of the species into New Zealand around 1860 still survive and the major cause of mortality of these cultivated specimens is felling. One such example is the 160 year old St. Barnabas Church tree in Stoke, Nelson, New Zealand.

Taxonomy 
Hesperocyparis macrocarpa is a paleoendemic, with fossilized remains discovered in Drakes Bay and Rancho La Brea evidencing a much larger extent in the past.

Along with other New World Cupressus species, it has recently been transferred to the genus Hesperocyparis, on genetic evidence that the New World Cupressus (NWC) are not very closely related to the Old World Cupressus (OWC) species.

Phylogenetic analysis of nuclear DNA sequences and organismic data recover distinct lineages, with the NWC being sister to Juniperus or Juniperus and the OWC. However, chloroplast sequences sometimes place both OWC and NWC with a common ancestor, possibly due to ancient hybridization. Other more obvious morphological differences support their separation, such as the presence of 3 to 5 cotyledons, as opposed to 2 in Old World species, glaucous seed coats, and monomorphic leaves on ultimate branch segments.

Analysis of phylogenetic relationships show that the species is placed within the Macrocarpa clade, which diverged from the Arizonica clade, both within Hesperocyparis. The two clades are separated biogeographically by the Transverse Ranges, which forms a barrier to any north–south migration of most species within these clades.

Distribution 
The two native cypress forest stands are protected, within Point Lobos State Reserve and Del Monte Forest. The natural habitat is noted for its cool, moist summers, almost constantly bathed by sea fog.

This species has been widely planted outside its native range, particularly along the coasts of California and Oregon.  Its European distribution includes Great Britain (including the Isle of Man and the Channel Islands), France, Ireland, Greece, Italy and Portugal. In New Zealand, plantings have naturalized, finding conditions there more favorable than in its native range. It has also been grown experimentally as a timber crop in Kenya.

The tree has been successfully planted in Sri Lanka, with a 130-year old specimen on view at the Hakgala Botanical Garden in Nuwara Eliya. 

Hesperocyparis macrocarpa is also grown in South Africa. For example, a copse has been planted to commemorate South African infantrymen who died in the Allied cause in Italy and North Africa during World War 2. As in California, the Cape trees are gnarled and wind-sculpted, and very beautiful.

Cultivation
Monterey cypress has been widely cultivated away from its native range, both elsewhere along the California coast, and in other areas with similar cool summer, mild winter oceanic climates. It is a popular private garden and public landscape tree in California. It is so widely planted in Golden Gate Park that the silhouette of the tree is sometimes printed as a symbol of the park.

When planted in areas with hot summers, for example in interior California away from the coastal fog belt, Monterey cypress has proved highly susceptible to cypress canker, caused by the fungus Seiridium cardinale, and rarely survives more than a few years. This disease is not a problem where summers are cool.

The foliage is slightly toxic to livestock and can cause miscarriages in cattle. Sawn logs are used by many craftspeople, some boat builders and small manufacturers, as a furniture structural material and a decorative wood because of its fine colours, though it must be preserved carefully to prevent the wood from splitting. It is also a fast, hot burning, albeit sparky (therefore not suited to open fires), firewood.

In Australasia 
In Australia and New Zealand, Monterey cypress is most frequently grown as a windbreak tree on farms, usually in rows or shelter belts. It is also planted in New Zealand as an ornamental tree and, occasionally, as a timber tree. One specimen – with a trunk diameter of more than  – is considered to be perhaps the largest in the world. The timber of Monterey cypress was used for fence posts on New Zealand farms before electric fencing became popular.

Cultivars 
A number of cultivars have been selected for garden use, including Goldcrest, with yellow-green, semi-juvenile foliage (with spreading scale-leaf tips) and Lutea with yellow-green foliage. Goldcrest has gained the Royal Horticultural Society's Award of Garden Merit (confirmed 2017).

Monterey cypress is one of the parents of the fast-growing cultivated hybrid Leyland cypress, Cupressus × Leylandii, the other parent being Nootka cypress, Callitropsis nootkatensis.

Cupressus macrocarpa cultivars grown in New Zealand are:
'Aurea Saligna'—long cascades of weeping, golden-yellow, thread-like foliage on a pyramidal tree
'Brunniana Aurea'—pillar or conical form with soft rich-golden foliage
'Gold Rocket'—narrow erect form with golden colouring, slow-growing
'Golden Pillar'—compact conical tree with dense yellow shoots and foliage
'Greenstead Magnificent'—dwarf form with blue-green foliage
'Lambertiana Aurea'—hardy upright form tolerating poor soil and climate conditions

Chemistry 
Isocupressic acid, a labdane diterpenoid, is an abortifacient component of H. macrocarpa. Monoterpenes (α- and γ-terpinene and terpinolene) are constituents of the foliage volatile oil. The oil exact composition is : α-pinene (20.2%), sabinene (12.0%), p-Cymene (7.0%) and terpinen-4-ol (29.6%). Unusual sesquiterpenes can be found in the foliage. Longiborneol (also known as juniperol or macrocarpol) can also be isolated from Monterey cypresses.

References 

macrocarpa
Endemic flora of California
Natural history of the California Coast Ranges
Natural history of Monterey County, California
Trees of the Southwestern United States
Plants described in 1847
Trees of Mediterranean climate
Garden plants of North America
Ornamental trees
Taxobox binomials not recognized by IUCN